Burscough is a town and civil parish in West Lancashire in the ceremonial county of Lancashire, England. It is located to the north of Ormskirk and northwest of Skelmersdale.

The parish also includes the hamlet of Tarlscough and the Martin Mere Wetland Centre. The population taken at the 2011 Census was 9,182.

History and growth

A substantial Roman fort with an area of 30,000 m2 and dating from the 1st century was located here, as recently confirmed by  geophysical survey and aerial photos. This was linked to neighbouring forts in the region, especially the nearest at Wigan and Ribchester, and  provides insight into Roman military strategy. The area was then occupied over the course of hundreds of years, as shown by the variety of pottery found at the site.

Burscough developed later as a small farming village on a low ridge above the West Lancashire Coastal Plain, and has Viking roots – Burh-skogr = fortress in the woods. Of early importance to the village was Burscough Priory, the ruins of which stand to the southwest of the current settlement. The priory formerly housed the tombs of the Earls of Derby, a prominent family in the region, which are now to be found in Ormskirk parish church.

With the building of the Leeds and Liverpool Canal and the coming of the railways in the mid-18th century new developments took place north of the original village, in what came to be called Burscough Bridge, though the two communities have long since melded together.

For over a hundred years (from ) there was an Ordnance Depot on the eastern edge of Burscough, but this closed in 1996 and the site has been redeveloped into housing.

RNAS Burscough (HMS Ringtail)
It was active between September 1943 and May 1946.

Community

Schools
Burscough has a number of primary schools:
Lordsgate Township C of E
St. John's Church of England
Burscough Village (formerly Colburne Close Primary)
Burscough Bridge Methodist
St. John's Roman Catholic
There is also a secondary school, Burscough Priory Academy (formerly Burscough Priory High School and Burscough Priory Science College) and also a small public library.

Retail and commercial
Shopping in the town is provided for by a large Tesco supermarket, a Booths, an Aldi and some other smaller shops including a Spar, as well as local florists, barber. Burscough Wharf provides a space for small independent businesses, alongside the artisan market.

Burscough Wharf
On 12 February 2011, a small retail and leisure development known as Burscough Wharf opened its doors to the public. Situated on the Leeds and Liverpool Canal, next to the southern bridge of the town centre, the development consists of approximately thirty units available for retail, leisure or office/studio space. Current businesses operating within the central square of Burscough Wharf consist of an instrumental music school, various independent gift shops, food and drink outlets, including a burger restaurant, gin bar and tea room, and health and beauty salons, and a fortnightly artisan market has been established.

Churches
Burscough has three churches: St John the Baptist Church, St John the Evangelist Roman Catholic Church and Burscough Methodist Church.

Transport

The A59 trunk road and Leeds and Liverpool Canal pass through Burscough and the A5209 brings large volumes of traffic through the town from where it connects to the A59. Lancashire County Council describe the town as suffering from "severe congestion". 
The canal junction with the Rufford Branch of the Leeds and Liverpool Canal is in Burscough. The town has two main railway stations: Burscough Junction, on the Liverpool to Preston line, was opened by the East Lancashire Railway on 2 April 1849, though the line now terminates at Ormskirk. Burscough Bridge, on the Southport to Manchester line, was opened by the Lancashire & Yorkshire Railway on 9 April 1855. There is also a third station two miles from the centre in New Lane, which is a small halt on the same line as Burscough Bridge. These lines formerly had a junction known as the Burscough curves. The removal of the curves prevents through train services between Ormskirk and Southport and Southport and Preston. 
The Burscough Junction Station Crash occurred on 15 January 1880 on the Liverpool to Preston railway line.

Victor Electrics
Burscough Bridge was the home of Victor Electrics, a manufacturer of battery electric road vehicles, including bread vans and milk floats. The company was formed by Outram's bakery of Southport, who could not find electric vehicles at a price they were prepared to pay, and so decided to build their own. The first bread van was produced in 1923, and proved so successful that several more were built. By 1927, the company looked at the possibility of allowing another company, who were already involved in electric vehicle production, to take over the enterprise, but they decided to retain control of the facility. The company was based on Victoria Street, just to the north of the Leeds and Liverpool Canal, where there was a bakery shown on maps from 1928, and engineering works on the 1972 map.

Initial models looked like a conventional van, with a bonnet at the front, which housed the batteries, but they made their first forward control model in 1931, and switched completely to this design, which became ubiquitous for milk floats, in 1935. Although they set up another company, Ross Auto Engineering, to manufacture battery electric vehicles in 1949, production of their own models continued at Burscough Bridge. They were taken over by Brook Motors, becoming Brook Victor Electric Vehicles in 1967. Acquired by Hawker Siddeley in 1970, they became Brook Crompton Parkinson Motors in 1973. One Victor milk float still exists. It is a B20 model dating from around 1955, and is currently awaiting restoration at the Transport Museum, Wythall, to the south of Birmingham.

Windmill Farm Railway
The Windmill Farm Railway is a narrow gauge railway line located at the Windmill Animal Farm. The railway operates over a  track at  gauge, using locomotives previously from the Fairbourne Railway, since that line has regauged to a smaller gauge.

Sport and leisure

Burscough F.C.
Burscough F.C. play at New Victoria Park, having moved from the now demolished Victoria Park in 2020. They won the FA Trophy in 2003 when they defeated conference side Tamworth in the final at Villa Park. In the 2005-06 FA Cup competition they beat league side Gillingham 3–2 at home in the first round. After winning the Northern Premier League in 2007, they were then relegated from the Conference North to the NPL Premier Division in the 2008–09 season. A further relegation followed and the club now play in the NPL Division 1 (North).

Allotment society
Although the allotments in Burscough have been used since the construction of the Richmond Avenue housing estate, the need for a formal society was identified by the Parish Council in order to obtain further land for allotments in Burscough. Following a series of meetings a society was formed and the constitution agreed during a meeting on 23 November 2011.

Fishing
Fishing is available on a day ticket.

Martin Mere

Martin Mere is a large wildfowl reserve and visitor attraction on the edge of Burscough and is owned by the Wildfowl and Wetlands Trust. In 2006 Martin Mere featured in the BBC television programme Autumnwatch.

Gallery

See also

 Listed buildings in Burscough
 Lathom and Burscough Urban District

References

 The Directory of Railway Stations, R.V.J.Butt, PSL, 1995,

External links 

 
Villages in Lancashire
Geography of the Borough of West Lancashire
Civil parishes in Lancashire
Roman auxiliary forts in England